The 1971 Canberra flood was a flash flood that occurred on 26 January 1971, in the Woden Valley district of Canberra, Australia.

Canberra flood 
The flood killed seven people including four children, injured 15 and affected 500 people. The insurance damage was estimated at A$ 9 million. It was estimated that around 95 mm of rain fell in one hour during this event. The Yarralumla Creek drainage channel peak rate of flow measured 186,891 litres per second at the Carruthers Street pluviograph near Yarra Glen at around 8:50pm.

The force of the water was strong enough to turn a bus 180 degrees on Melrose Drive south east of the intersection with Yarra Glen. The intersection was covered to a depth of an estimated 1.83m and the floodwaters spread an estimated 183m wide, east to west across the intersection of Yamba Drive, Melrose Drive and Yarra Glen.  A number of people and cars were swept into the Yarralumla Creek drainage channel from a low level crossing at the junction of Yamba Drive, Melrose Drive and Yarra Glen.

Yamba Drive was covered in fast flowing water to at least 275m south of the Hindmarsh Drive intersection where a white car and the driver were swept into the Long Gully drainage channel.

Victims 
The 1971 Canberra flood victims names and ages:
 Carmel Anne Smith (19)
 Margaret Mary Smith (15)
 Michael John Smith (6)
 Jennifer Ann Seymour (12)
 Dianne Elizabeth Seymour (8)
 Lon Victor Cumberland (18)
 Roderick Dumaresq Simon (20)

Aftermath
One Australian Police Officer, Constable Jeff Brown, was six months later awarded the British Empire Medal for Gallantry for rescue efforts during the event. Four Australian Police Officers were later awarded the Queen's Commendation for Brave Conduct for rescue efforts during the event.

Following the flood seven crosses were erected near the side of the road to mark the victims. A permanent memorial was officially dedicated on 26 January 2010.

See also 

 Severe storms in Australia
 List of disasters in Australia by death toll

Notes

References
 
 
 Archives ACT file 71/266 parts 1-6 National Capital Development Commission. Woden Valley floods 26 January 1971.
 Archives ACT file 71/344 Department of the Interior. Land Administration Branch. Yarralumla Creek flood complaints and eye witness accounts.
 Archives ACT file 71/924 Department of the Interior. Woden Valley flood reports.
 The Canberra Times (26 January 1991), The Tuesday it rained heartbreak.
 The Canberra Times (27 January 1971), 1 Dead, 4 Missing in Storm Flash flood in Woden Valley.
 The Canberra Times (28 January 1971), Search for further victims of disaster continues 4 bodies found, three people missing.
 The Canberra Times (28 January 1971), Tragedy in Woden.
 The Canberra Times (28 January 1971), Canberra flood.
 The Canberra Times (25 February 1971), Woden flood inquiry.
 The Canberra Times (16 March 1971), Coroner's verdict.

External links
 BOM Pluvial period of the 1970s
 BOM Summary of Significant Severe Thunderstorm Events in the ACT and NSW - 1970/1979
 BOM Impact of Severe Thunderstorms in Australia (see #19)
 The Canberra Times (26 January 2010), Finding peace at last after floods
 ABC News story (26 January 2010)

1971
Canberra Flood, 1971
Disasters in the Australian Capital Territory
1970s in Canberra
1971 disasters in Australia
January 1971 events in Oceania
Weather events in Australia